State Road 23, from Čačak via Zlatibor commonly known as Zlatibor Highway, is an IB-class road in central and western Serbia, connecting Pojate with Montenegro at Gostun. It is located in Šumadija and Western Serbia.

Before the new road categorization regulation given in 2013, the route wore the following names: M 5, O 17, M 23.1, M 22 and M 21 (before 2012) / A4, 15, and A6 (after 2012).

The existing route is a main road with two traffic lanes. By the valid Space Plan of Republic of Serbia the section between Preljina and Požega would be transferred to the new A2 motorway, providing the faster link between Belgrade , Montenegro, and Bosnia and Herzegovina, while the Pojate – Preljina part would link A1 and A2 motorways with the planned route A5. Everything is expected to be completed by 2020.

The road is a part of the European routes E761 and E763.

Sections

Planned motorway
In order to provide the faster link from Belgrade to Western Serbia and Montenegro and alleviate the dangers of the Ibar Highway, the new A2 motorway is being built on a parallel route Belgrade – Preljina (town in the municipality of Čačak) and on part of the Zlatibor Highway from Preljina to Požega.

Also, the section from Pojate to Preljina would be replaced with motorway A5, by linking the A1 and A2 motorways, allowing the citizens from Southern and Eastern Serbia to reach Western Serbia and surrounding countries Bosnia&Herzegovina and Montenegro.

See also
 Roads in Serbia
 European route E761
 European route E763

References

External links
 Official website – Roads of Serbia (Putevi Srbije)
 Official website – Corridors of Serbia (Koridori Srbije) (Serbian)
 Map of Serbian main and regional roads

State roads in Serbia